Publius Cornelius Scipio was a Roman senator, who was active during the Principate. He was consul for the year 56  as the colleague of Quintus Volusius Saturninus. As he belongs to the family of the Cornelii Lentuli, one of the patrician branches of the Cornelii, his name may be Publius Cornelius Lentulus Scipio.

Scipio was the son of Publius Cornelius Lentulus Scipio, suffect consul in 24, by his first wife, whose name has not yet been recovered. Publius Cornelius Scipio Asiaticus, suffect consul in 68, is known to have been his younger half-brother.

References 

 

1st-century Romans
Imperial Roman consuls
Cornelius Scipio, Publius (56)